The 2022 Virginia Cavaliers men's soccer team represented the University of Virginia during the 2022 NCAA Division I men's soccer season.  The Cavaliers were led by head coach George Gelnovatch, in his twenty-seventh season.  They played their home games at Klöckner Stadium in Charlottesville, Virginia.  This was the team's 82nd season playing organized men's college soccer and their 70th playing in the Atlantic Coast Conference.

The Cavaliers finished the season 10–4–5 overall and 5–1–2 in ACC play to finish in second place in the Coastal Division. As the third overall seed in the ACC Tournament they earned a first round bye, defeated Pittsburgh in the Quarterfinals but fell to Syracuse in the Semifinals in a penalty shoot-out.

Background

The Cavaliers finished the season 6–9–3 overall and 2–5–1 in ACC play to finish in sixth place in the Coastal Division.  As the eleventh overall seed in the ACC Tournament they lost in the First Round to sixth seeded Wake Forest.  They received did not receive an invite to the NCAA Tournament.

Player movement

Players leaving

Players arriving

Incoming Transfers

Recruiting Class

Squad

Roster

Team management

Source:

Schedule

Source:

|-
!colspan=6 style=""| Exhibition

|-
!colspan=6 style=""| Regular Season

|-
!colspan=6 style=""| ACC Tournament

|-
!colspan=6 style=""| NCAA Tournament

Awards and honors

2023 MLS Super draft

Source:

Rankings

References

2022
American men's college soccer teams 2022 season
2022 Atlantic Coast Conference men's soccer season
2022 NCAA Division I Men's Soccer Tournament participants
2022 in sports in Virginia